Meketibolodon is a genus of extinct mammal from the Kimmeridgian (Upper Jurassic) Camadas de Guimarota of Guimarota, Portugal.  It was a relatively early member of the also extinct order Multituberculata, suborder Plagiaulacida, family Paulchoffatiidae. The genus was named by Hahn G. in 1993 based on nine specimens of lower jaw.

"Meketibolodon (Hahn 1993) is distinguished from the other genera [of Paulchoffatiidae] by two characters: the tooth row is significantly convexly curved upwards, and the corpus mandibulae has angled margins ventrally (Hahn and Hahn 1998b). The incisor is more strongly curved than it is the case in Paulchoffatia, and its root is longer. The corpus mandibulae is similarly massive to that in Paulchoffatia" (Hahn and Hahn 2000, p. 105). The corpus mandibulae is the part of the lower jaw beneath the tooth row, and mekéti (μηκέτι) is Greek for 'no longer'.

References 
 Hahn G. (1978), Neue Unterkiefer von Multituberculaten aus dem Malm Portugals. Geologica et Palaeontologica 12, p. 177-212. (A new multituberculate lower jaw from the Malm of Portugal.)
 Hahn G. and Hahn R. (2000), Multituberculates from the Guimarota mine, p. 97-107 in Martin T & Krebs B (eds), Guimarota - A Jurassic Ecosystem, Published by Dr Friedrich Pfeil, Münich, Germany.
 Kielan-Jaworowska Z. and Hurum J.H. (2001), Phylogeny and Systematics of multituberculate mammals. Paleontology 44, p. 389-429.
 Much of this information has been derived from  Multituberculata Cope, 1884.

Multituberculates
Late Jurassic mammals
Fossils of Portugal
Prehistoric mammal genera